Luigi Delneri (born 23 August 1950), often incorrectly written as Del Neri, is an Italian football manager and a former player.

After a playing career as a midfielder including for several Serie A clubs, he began managing in the lower leagues, and took Ternana to consecutive promotions into Serie B. He then spent four years at Chievo, helping the Verona neighbourhood club into Serie A for the first time and 5th place and UEFA Cup qualification in their first season at the top. 

Delneri left Chievo in 2004 for UEFA Champions League holders Porto, but was dismissed within weeks and before a competitive game. He subsequently managed several Serie A clubs in the following years, including one season with Juventus after taking Sampdoria to fourth place in 2010.

Playing career
Born at Aquileia, Udine, Delneri made his professional debut as player at the age of 16 for SPAL, Ferrara's football team, for which he had worked as storer. After playing for Foggia and Novara, he moved to Udinese, with whom he gained promotion to Serie A, Italy's top division. He was later traded to Sampdoria and then to Vicenza, Siena, Pro Gorizia and Opitergina, an amateur team from Oderzo, where he ended his playing career at 34.

Coaching career

Early career / Chievo
After his retirement as a player, Delneri stayed at Oderzo, appointed by chairman Ettore Setten (now owner of Treviso) as head coach. In 1986, he signed for Serie D team Pro Gorizia. He then coached Partinicaudace, a minor Sicilian Serie D team, in 1989, Teramo, Ravenna, Novara and Nocerina of Serie C2; with this last team he won the league and promotion to Serie C1. He then moved to Ternana of Serie C2, guiding it to Serie B after two consecutive promotions.

In 1998, after his second consecutive promotion, Delneri was signed by Serie A's Empoli, but was fired before starting the championship and was subsequently recalled by his former team Ternana in Serie B.

In 2000, Delneri signed with Chievo of Serie B, a team representing a small quarter of the city of Verona. It was the beginning of the so-called "Chievo miracle" in which the team was promoted for the very first time to Serie A, where they topped the league for the first half of the season and then qualified for the UEFA Cup by coming 5th.

Porto, Roma and Palermo
In June 2004, Delneri signed a three-year contract to succeed José Mourinho at UEFA Champions League holders Porto. He was sacked on 7 August, without even managing a competitive game, allegedly for missing training sessions.

Delneri became Roma's third manager of the season in October 2004, after Cesare Prandelli and Rudi Völler. His team failed to advance from their Champions League group, and he dropped young forward Antonio Cassano after a dispute. He resigned from his two-year contract in March 2005, with the team in 7th, and handed the job over to Bruno Conti.

In June 2005, Delneri signed for Palermo, succeeding Francesco Guidolin who had quit for new challenges after qualifying them for the 2005–06 UEFA Cup. He was fired on 28 January 2006 with the team in 10th after a 3–1 home loss to Siena, having taken them into the knockout stages of the UEFA Cup.

Chievo return, Atalanta and Sampdoria

On 16 October 2006, Delneri returned to coach Chievo, replacing Giuseppe Pillon at the 15th-place club. Despite a strong start, he did not manage to save his side from relegation, losing a spot in the following season's Serie A with a 2–0 loss to Catania on the final matchday.

Following the relegation, Delneri was announced as new Atalanta boss in June 2007. He led the team from Bergamo to 9th and 11th place in his two seasons; he announced in April 2009 that he would leave at the end of the season.

Delneri left to take over at Sampdoria on 1 June 2009, a team that had just finished 13th. He guided Sampdoria to a surprising fourth-place finish, and a spot to the third qualifying round of the 2010–11 UEFA Champions League, leaving the next day.

Juventus
On 19 May 2010, two days after leaving Sampdoria, Delneri was appointed as coach of Juventus. At the end of the 2010–11 season, having finished 7th and not qualified for Europe, Delneri was sacked by the Juventus board of directors.

Later career
On 22 October 2012, Delneri was named new head coach of tenth-place Genoa in Serie A, succeeding sacked coach Luigi De Canio at Sampdoria's rivals. On 20 January 2013, however, Delneri was himself sacked following a 0–2 home loss to Catania and a string of bad results for the team, which recorded only two wins in his 13 matches with the club.

Delneri was hired at another of his former club's rivals, this time Chievo's adversaries Hellas Verona, replacing Andrea Mandorlini on 1 December 2015; the team had not won once all season. He left by mutual consent after the season ended in relegation for the club on 23 May 2016.

On 3 October 2016, Delneri signed a one-year deal with the option of a second at Udinese, succeeding Giuseppe Iachini who had won two of seven games. He finished the campaign in 13th, earning a second year, but took 12 points from the first 12 games and lost his job on 21 November 2017 when three points above the relegation places.

On 4 September 2020, Delneri was officially appointed manager of Brescia, following their relegation to Serie B. On 6 October 2020, after one draw and one loss, positioned in last place, Delneri was sacked.

Style of management
As a manager, Delneri is known for using a spectacular, offensive-minded style of football, which is heavily influenced by Arrigo Sacchi's tactics at Milan, as well as Dutch total football. His teams are known for their work-rate, strength, heavy running, and aggressive use of pressing when defending off the ball, while they are known for their movement off the ball, ability to change positions, and make overlapping runs when attacking. A tactically intelligent manager, his preferred formation is the 4–4–2, which relies on a high defensive line, although he has also been known to adopt other systems which better suit the characteristics of his players, including the 4–3–3.

Managerial statistics

Honours

Coach
Individual
Serie A Coach of the Year (1): 2001–02
Panchina d'Oro (1): 2001–02

References

External links

1950 births
Living people
People from Aquileia
Association football midfielders
Italian footballers
Italian football managers
S.P.A.L. players
Calcio Foggia 1920 players
Novara F.C. players
Udinese Calcio players
U.C. Sampdoria players
L.R. Vicenza players
A.C.N. Siena 1904 players
A.S. Pro Gorizia players
Serie A players
Serie B players
Teramo Calcio managers
Ravenna F.C. managers
Novara F.C. managers
A.S.G. Nocerina managers
Ternana Calcio managers
Empoli F.C. managers
A.C. ChievoVerona managers
A.S. Roma managers
Atalanta B.C. managers
Palermo F.C. managers
Juventus F.C. managers
Serie A managers
Serie B managers
FC Porto managers
U.C. Sampdoria managers
Genoa C.F.C. managers
Italian expatriate football managers
Expatriate football managers in Portugal
Italian expatriate sportspeople in Portugal
Hellas Verona F.C. managers
Udinese Calcio managers
Brescia Calcio managers
Footballers from Friuli Venezia Giulia